The Labeninae is a subfamily within the parasitic wasp family Ichneumonidae (aka Darwin wasps or Ichneumon wasps). There are 12 extant genera (listed below), grouped within four tribes, that exhibit a predominantly Gondwanan distribution - most genera and species are found in Australia and South America. A few species of Labena and Grotea are found in North America, with hypotheses suggesting that the group radiated on Gondwanaland prior to the separation of Australia but after the separation of Africa/India/Madagascar.  

Some species from the tribe Labenini have been reared from wood-boring beetles of the Coleopteran families Buprestidae, Cerambycidae, and Curculionidae. Members of the tribe Orthognatheliini (sometimes, incorrectly, called Groteini) parasitize solitary bees; Labium wasps are known to parasitise ground-nesting, solitary bees, while Grotea are known parasitoids of cavity-nesting, solitary bees. Species of Poecilocryptus are thought to be phytophagous, due to adaptations of the larval head capsule. However, as with much of the Ichneumonidae, knowledge of many labenine species' ecology, biology, and evolution is extremely limited or completely lacking.

Genera
These genera belong to the subfamily Labeninae:
 Alaothyris Gauld, 1984 c g
 Apechoneura Kriechbaumer, 1890 c g
 Certonotus Kriechbaumer, 1889 c g
 Gauldianus Lanfranco, 2000 c g
 Grotea Cresson, 1864 c g b
 Labena Cresson, 1864 c g b
 Labium Brullé, 1846 c g
 Ozlabium Gauld & Wahl, 2000 c g
 Poecilocryptus Cameron, 1901 c g
 Torquinsha Gauld & Wahl, 2000 c g
 Urancyla Gauld, 1984 c g
 Xenothyris Townes, 1969 c g
Data sources: i = ITIS, c = Catalogue of Life, g = GBIF, b = Bugguide.net

References

Further reading
 Townes, H.K. (1969) Genera of Ichneumonidae, Part 1 (Ephialtinae, Tryphoninae, Labiinae (=Labeninae), Adelognathinae, Xoridinae, Agriotypinae). Memoirs of the American Entomological Institute 11: 1–300.

Ichneumonidae
Apocrita subfamilies
Taxa named by William Harris Ashmead